Peter Knudsen may refer to:

Peter Christian Knudsen, politician
Peter Knudsen (footballer, born 1970)
Peter Knudsen (footballer, born 1973)
Peter Øvig Knudsen, writer